HD 81817 is a possible binary star system with two brown dwarf companions in the northern circumpolar constellation of Draco. It has an orange hue and is visible to the naked eye with an apparent visual magnitude of 4.28. The system is located at a distance of approximately 990 light years from the Sun based on parallax, and is drifting closer with a radial velocity of −7 km/s. It is a member of the IC 2391 moving group.

The primary component of this system is an aging giant star with a stellar classification of K3III. The star's chromosphere is of the type called "hybrid", displaying a cool stellar wind in combination with hot emission lines. It appears to be the source for the X-ray emission coming from this system. The star is 150 million years old with 4.3 times the mass of the Sun. With the supply of hydrogen at its core exhausted, the star has expanded to 83.8 times the Sun's radius.

A possible companion star was discovered in 1984 based upon its ultraviolet spectrum. The distribution of the far ultraviolet flux matches that of a white dwarf star of class DA. A 2020 study finds it unlikely that there is a white dwarf companion; instead claiming the radial velocity variations are caused by a substellar object HD 80817 b, probably a brown dwarf, and possibly another substellar object. If the latter mass estimate is correct, this object would be a low-mass star, probably a red dwarf. Further observations through 2022 have confirmed that the companion is indeed a brown dwarf, in addition to the detection of a second brown dwarf on a closer orbit. By some definitions, these objects could be considered supermassive planets, similar to those around Nu Ophiuchi.

References 

K-type giants
White dwarfs
Spectroscopic binaries

Draco (constellation)
Durchmusterung objects
081817
047193
3751